Wolf Parade (4 Song EP) is the first EP by Canadian indie rock band Wolf Parade.

Rerecorded versions of "Modern World" and "Dinner Bells" would later appear on their debut LP Apologies to the Queen Mary, along with the version of Modern World that appears on this EP as a bonus track on the iTunes release of the LP, under the name Modern World (Original).

Track listing

Credits
 Dan Boeckner – guitar, vocals
 Spencer Krug – piano, keyboards, vocals, cover art, design
 Arlen Thompson – drums, engineering, mastering
 Jenny Lee Craig - cover art, design

2003 debut EPs
Wolf Parade albums